"Hope You're Feelin' Me (Like I'm Feelin' You)" is a song written by Bobby David and Jim Rushing, and recorded by American country music artist Charley Pride.  It was released in July 1975 as the second single from the album Charley.  The song was Pride's fifteenth number one on the country chart.  The single stayed at number one for one week and spent a total of eleven weeks on the country chart.

Charts

Weekly charts

Year-end charts

References

Charley Pride songs
1975 singles
Song recordings produced by Jack Clement
RCA Records singles
1975 songs
Songs written by Jim Rushing